Thomas Dunlop Galbraith, 1st Baron Strathclyde, PC (20 March 1891 – 12 July 1985), was a Scottish Unionist Party politician.

After serving in the Royal Navy, he became a chartered accountant and practised, 1925–70. He was elevated to the peerage in 1955 as Lord Strathclyde (of Barskimming in the County of Ayr), and died three decades later. As his eldest son, Sir Tam Galbraith, died in 1982, the barony was inherited by his grandson Thomas Galbraith, 2nd Baron Strathclyde.

Early life and education
Galbraith was born into Clan Galbraith, which traces its roots to 12th-century laird Gilchrist Bretnach, the 15x great-grandfather of King George I. He was one of eight children born to surgeon William Brodie Galbraith  (1855–1942) and Annie Jack Dunlop (sister of Sir Thomas Dunlop, 1st Baronet). He had an older brother, Walter, and younger brothers William, David, Norman, Robert, and Alexander, and a younger sister, Annie.

Galbraith was educated at Glasgow Academy; Eastman's, Southsea; Royal Naval College, Osborne and Royal Naval College, Dartmouth.

Royal Navy

Galbraith joined the Royal Navy in 1903. He was promoted to Lieutenant in 1913 and served aboard the battleships  and  during the First World War. Three of his younger brothers were killed in the war while serving in the Highland Light Infantry: Capt. William Brodie Galbraith (1892–1915), David Boyd Galbraith (1894–1915) and Norman Dunlop Galbraith (1896–1918). He left the Royal Navy in 1922 and formally retired in 1925.

When the Second World War began, Galbraith joined the Scottish Naval Command. He was later sent to Washington, D.C. to represent the Admiralty, which was negotiating supplies prior to the enactment of Lend-Lease in 1941.

Political career
Galbraith's political career began in local government where he served as a councillor on Glasgow Corporation from 1933 until 1940. For part of that time he was vice-chair of the Progressive Party. He served as Member of Parliament (MP) for Glasgow Pollok from 1940 to 1955, being originally elected at a by-election and then at the 1945, 1950 and 1951 general elections. He served as Under-Secretary of State for Scotland in Winston Churchill's caretaker government from May to July 1945.

He was made a peer on 4 May 1955, shortly before the 1955 general election, and took his seat in the House of Lords the following day. He served as a Minister of State at the Scottish Office until 1958. By 1964, Strathclyde was serving as chairman of the North of Scotland Hydro-Electric Board.

He was awarded the Freedom of Dingwall in 1965 and the Freedom of the City of Aberdeen in 1966.

Marriage and children

On 2 December 1915, Strathclyde married Ida Jane Galloway, daughter of Thomas Galloway of Auchendrane House, Ayrshire. They had seven children, five of whom served in the Royal Navy. Their second son was killed during the Second World War in the English Channel while captaining the French submarine chaser Chasseur 6 that was hit by a German torpedo boat.

 Hon. Sir Thomas Galloway Dunlop Galbraith (10 March 1917 – 2 January 1982)
Thomas Galbraith, 2nd Baron Strathclyde
 Lt. William Brodie Galloway Galbraith  (20 September 1918 – KIA 12 October 1940)
 Hon. James Muir Galloway Galbraith  (27 September 1920 – 4 October 2003)
 Hon. Ida Jean Galloway Galbraith (21 January 1922 – 9 February 2018)
 Hon. Norman Dunlop Galloway Galbraith (24 January 1925 – 24 June 2013)
 Hon. David Muir Galloway Galbraith (born 8 March 1928 – 12 August 2006)
 Hon. Heather Margaret Anne Galloway Galbraith (born 27 February 1930)

Baroness Ida Strathclyde died in June 1985. A month later, Strathclyde died at his estate at Barskimming, in Mauchline, Ayrshire, in 1985, and the barony passed to his grandson.

Arms

References

External links 
 
 Clan Galbraith: Lord Strathclyde

1891 births
1985 deaths
People educated at the Glasgow Academy
Royal Navy officers
Royal Navy personnel of World War I
Galbraith, Thomas
Galbraith, Thomas
Scottish accountants
Barons Strathclyde
Members of the Privy Council of the United Kingdom
Galbraith, Thomas
Galbraith, Thomas
Galbraith, Thomas
Galbraith, Thomas
UK MPs who were granted peerages
People educated at the Royal Naval College, Osborne
Galbraith, Thomas
Conservative Party (UK) hereditary peers
Hereditary barons created by Elizabeth II
Galbraith, Thomas
Ministers in the Churchill caretaker government, 1945
Ministers in the third Churchill government, 1951–1955
Ministers in the Eden government, 1955–1957
Ministers in the Macmillan and Douglas-Home governments, 1957–1964
20th-century Scottish businesspeople